Aspitates orciferaria is a moth of the family Geometridae. It is known from the polar region of the Ural Mountains and northern North America.

Subspecies
Aspitates orciferaria orciferaria
Aspitates orciferaria baffinensis (Munroe, 1963)
Aspitates orciferaria churchillensis (Munroe, 1963)
Aspitates orciferaria occidentalis (Munroe, 1963)

References

Moths described in 1862
Aspitatini
Moths of Europe
Moths of North America
Taxa named by Francis Walker (entomologist)